Supriya Sahu (born 27 July 1968) is a senior Indian bureaucrat of  Additional Secretary rank from the 1991 batch of Indian Administrative Service. Currently, she is posted as Additional Chief Secretary to Government, Department of Environment, Climate Change and Forests. Earlier, she also held additional charge of The Tamil Nadu Small Tea Growers’ Industrial Cooperative Tea Factories’ Federation Limited (INDCOSERVE), Coonoor as Principal Secretary-cum-Managing Director. Earlier, Sahu served as the Director-General of Doordarshan between July 2016 to September 2017. Her appointment as head of Doordarshan was cleared by the Appointments Committee of the Cabinet chaired by the Prime Minister Narendra Modi. She was also the Co-Vice President of Asian Broadcasting Union, and was elected to the post at the 55th General Assembly of ABU.

Career 

Earlier, she worked as a Joint Secretary, Ministry of Information & Broadcasting, Government of India. Before central deputation, she served as Additional Collector of Vellore district and Managing Director, Tamil Nadu State AIDS Control Society (TANSACS). On 25 October 2016, she was elected as the new vice-president of the Asia-Pacific Broadcasting Union.

In February 2016, she was selected by Prasar Bharati, India's public service broadcaster, to be the Director General of state broadcaster Doordarshan after which the broadcaster had recommended her name to the information & broadcasting (I&B) ministry for approval. Sahu has earlier served as the director at I&B ministry and later got promoted to the post of Joint Secretary.

In early 2018, she was appointed Acting President of Asia-Pacific Broadcasting Union (ABU), which she handed over to the new President in October 2018. She is also the first women Vice-President of ABU.

Environment and Climate Change 
She has currently posted as Additional Chief Secretary, Department of Environment, Climate Change and Forests. Following the ban on use of plastic bags in Tamil Nadu, Ms Sahu launched campaign to promote use of cloth bags among people. Called  Meendum Manjapai, the cloth bags are designed to inspire people to say good bye to single use plastic. The campaign was launched by the Chief Minister of Tamil Nadu M K Stalin. During her tenure, Tamil Nadu added four new sites to prestigious Ramsar list of wetlands. To create working models to bring about grassroots-level changes in combating climate change, Tamil Nadu is converting 10 villages into climate smart villages. The initiative aims to promote use of solar energy in these villages, ways of treating and reusing of wastewater among other initiatives. Tamil Nadu has launched a 10-month mentorship programme for women to create better understanding of climate change and work on initiatives to mitigate impact of climate change in areas of their influence. The state has also set up a special purpose vehicle (SPV) two manage three natural conservation missions in the state -  Tamil Nadu Climate Change, Tamil Nadu Green and Tamil Nadu Wetlands. SPV’s mission includes planning, execution and monitoring of the State-wide programme for the climate change adaptation and mitigation, wetlands mapping and restoration.

The INDCOSERVE 
As Managing Director, INDCOSERVE, Sahu led the transformation of cooperative through initiatives to enhance the income of tea growers and increasing tea cooperatives' brand recognition. Nearly 30,000 small tea growers are likely to benefit from the initiative. Cooperative also started the practice of fixing in advance the green tea leaf prices grown by the small tea growers. Tea farmers received all time high price for green leaves in August 2020.

For marketing of the tea produced by the farmers' cooperative, Sahu started a unique initiative called 'Tea Vandis' where the produce is marketed by tribes of The Nilgiris district. Under this initiative, INDCOSERVE provides a food truck to Toda tribal communities. Currently, four 'Vandis' are operational at different vantage points in Ooty district. Sahu inaugurated 'INDCO Tea House' to popularise and market variety of tea manufactured by farmers' cooperative.

The cooperative launched six new tea manufacturers - Nilgiris Kahwa Tea, Honey Hill Tea, Marlimund Tea, Bedford Tea, Mountain Rose Gold Tea and Ooty Gold Tea. Earlier, INDCOSERVE advertised only mud-grade tea or Ooty Tea. These products will also be sold through e-commerce platforms Amazon and Flipkart.

The cooperative also launched a drive to rope in small tea farmers to adopt organic farming by launching ‘Scope Certification’, at the Kinnakorai Industrial Cooperative. After continuously practicing organic farming for three years, farmers will be awarded 'organic certificate' for their tea produce. It has been widely reported that several factories of INDCOSERVE turned profit in last two years since Ms Sahu joined the organisation.

Doordarshan

Revenue 
During Sahu's tenure as Director-General of Doordarshan, the public broadcaster's revenues increased to Rs 827.51 during the financial year 2016–17.  It surpassed its annual target of Rs 800 crore and posted a growth of Rs 318.06 crore if compared to the previous financial year. In order to increase its revenue, Doordarshan started adopting new strategies including the auction of slots on DD Freedish and planned to auction its prime time slots. In 2018, Doordarshan also recorded its top viewership on Republic Day i.e. 38 million viewers on a single day. 
In April 2019, she announced that Doordarshan had recorded its highest revenue in the last five years, was no longer a loss-making organisation. In 2014–15, Doordarshan reported a net collection of Rs 884.2 crore, whereas in 2018–19, it hasgone up to Rs 943.8 crore.

Programming 

Besides, Doordarshan has started various new programming initiatives under her leadership. It includes Doordarshan launching two new science channels i.e. DD Science and India Science. These channels aim to boost scientific temperament among the people. Two channels will have science-based documentaries, studio-based discussions, virtual walkthroughs of scientific institutions, interviews and short films and will be free to access. In December 2018, Supriya Sahu launched DD Roshni, an educational channel as part of its partnership with Bruhat Bengaluru Mahanagara Palike and Microsoft. DD has launched ‘Mahila Kisan Awards’, a reality show that tells the stories of unsung women heroes of Indian agriculture.

Doordarshan also launched Kashmiri version of Kaun Banega Crorepati, which will be broadcast on DD Kashir with vernacular name Kus Bani Koshur Karorpaet. The show will be produced by Studio Next of Sony Pictures who hold the licence to produce the KBC format in India.

New technology 
Under Sahu's leadership, Doordarshan started digital terrestrial transmission (DTT) and is planning to expand the services to 16 cities by 2017. There were reports in January 2018 that Doordarshan was planning to develop its own Over-the-Top (OTT) content platform to reach out to audiences across the globe. Doordarshan was said to be in talks with other content platforms to put their content out in public.

Community Radio 
She has also been credited for giving a shape and direction to India's Community Radio movement. It was under her leadership that Community Radio was included in the 12th Five Year Plan of India. During her period, the Ministry of I&B, opened the doors and increased engagement with the Community Radio sector. Her initiatives include annual National Community Radio Sammelan - the annual conclave of stations, and an annual publication on the work of Community Radio stations - Community Radio Compendium. Second National Community Radio Sammelan also saw the use of social media by the government, when the ministry of I&B live-tweeted the event on Twitter.

HIV/ AIDS and Tuberculosis 

She has also spearheaded Tamil Nadu's HIV and tuberculosis programmes. As Project Director, Tamil Nadu State AIDS Control Society, she initiated the integrated TB and HIV testing programme in the state. During her tenure, the state started providing a comprehensive package of HIV/AIDS services to private maternity hospitals in the state in an effort to match services provided at government-run maternity hospitals. It included counseling, treatment, the prevention of mother-to-child transmission and managing HIV/TB coinfection. In 2006, she launched a joint initiative for orphaned and vulnerable children affected by HIV/AIDS. In 2008, during her tenure as PD of TANSACS, she took the lead in enabling sensitisation of the police department across cadres and districts of Tamil Nadu on issues of groups marginalised on account of their sexuality and gender identity. This successful programme was carried out with the involvement of community members involved in the HIV/AIDS targeted intervention programme working with men who have sex with men (MSM) and transgender women (TG).

Operation Blue Mountain Campaign 
She is known for her pioneering work in protecting the environment in Nilgiris district of Tamil Nadu. She led a campaign known as 'Operation Blue Mountain', to ban the use of plastic in the district. She has been hailed as a hands-on collector for Operation Blue Mountain in the Nilgiris to cleanse the environment of the plastic menace. The campaign was crucial to unclog the river sources and springs in the popular hill station of Nilgiris. Her experiment with Nilgiris has been documented by erstwhile Planning Commission and UNDP as a best practice on governance from Indian states. As Collector of Nilgiris district, Sahu led a campaign to mark 'International Year of the Mountains, 2002". This included the creation of a world record by planting trees in one or several of the degraded shola forests. On 24 June 2003, people of Nilgiris under the leadership of Supriya Sahu planted 42,182 trees — breaking the existing Guinness World Record by a large margin.

See also

 LGBT Culture in Chennai
 Doordarshan
 The Nilgiris District
 Community Radio
 Ministry of Information and Broadcasting (India)

References

Living people
Indian Administrative Service officers
Indian government officials
Doordarshan
State media
1968 births